The 1995 West Somerset District Council election took place on 4 May 1995 to elect members of West Somerset District Council in Somerset, England. The whole council was up for election and Independents lost overall control of the council to no overall control.

Election result

Ward results

By-elections between 1995 and 1999

Minehead South

Quantock Vale

Minehead North

Porlock and Oare

References

1995 English local elections
1995
1990s in Somerset